You Walk So Softly (German: Gustav Mond, Du gehst so stille) is a 1927 German silent comedy film directed by Reinhold Schünzel and starring Schünzel, Yvette Darnys and Jakob Tiedtke. Schünzel ran into trouble with his superiors at UFA because he had not submitted his screenplay for approval before filming began. The film's art direction was by Erich Czerwonski.

Cast

References

Bibliography
 Kreimeier, Klaus. The Ufa Story: A History of Germany's Greatest Film Company, 1918-1945. University of California Press, 1999.

External links

1927 films
Films of the Weimar Republic
German silent feature films
Films directed by Reinhold Schünzel
UFA GmbH films
German black-and-white films
1927 comedy films
German comedy films
1920s German films